Joel Sanchez is an American college baseball coach and former pitcher and shortstop. He is the pitching coach at Jackson State University. Sanchez played two seasons at NMJC, followed by two seasons at New Mexico State. He then played three seasons with Ciudad Juárez of the Mexican League. In 2001, he became an assistant coach with Bethune-Cookman.  He spent eight seasons with the Wildcats, during which they won seven Mid-Eastern Athletic Conference championships and made seven NCAA Regional appearances.  Sanchez served as recruiting coordinator and pitching coach, and saw fifteen of his players (plus three more than he recruited) drafted.  He then spent one season each as pitching coach with the Vermont Lake Monsters and Gulf Coast League Nationals of the Washington Nationals organization.  Sanchez next spent one season as an assistant with NJCAA Daytona State. Before moving to North Carolina A&T. He was named head coach at North Carolina A&T prior to the 2012 season.

Head coaching record

References

External links
Joel Sanchez, Assistant Baseball Coach, Jackson State University Tigers

Living people
Bethune–Cookman Wildcats baseball coaches
Daytona State Falcons baseball coaches
Minor league baseball coaches
New Mexico State Aggies baseball players
NMJC Thunderbirds baseball players
North Carolina A&T Aggies baseball coaches
Jackson State Tigers baseball coaches
Year of birth missing (living people)